As of the completion of the , 117 ice hockey players in the National Hockey League (NHL) have scored at least 100 points in a single NHL regular season.

Collectively, these players have achieved this feat on 292 occasions, playing for 26 franchises. This includes eight additions in 2021–22; six first-timers and two players who achieved a repeat 100-point season. Including seven franchises that have changed cities, there have been 29 teams with 100-point players.

Season achievements
Esposito finished the season with 126 points, and two other players achieved 100 points that season: Bobby Hull, who finished with 107 points, and Gordie Howe, who finished with 103 points.

Since 1968–69, there have only been seven seasons without a 100-point player.

Player achievements
The player with the most 100-point seasons is Wayne Gretzky, with 15 (technically scoring 100 points 19 times, when allowing for his four 200-point seasons). Mario Lemieux is second, with 10 seasons of 100 points. Gretzky also holds the record of 13 consecutive 100-point seasons. The defenceman with the most 100-point seasons, and the most consecutive, is Bobby Orr, with six.

Three players could have made the list on assists alone: Orr, Gretzky (11 times), and Lemieux have had more than 100 assists in a single season.

On six occasions a player has been traded during a 100-point season: Jean Ratelle, Bernie Nicholls, John Cullen, Teemu Selanne, Wayne Gretzky, and Joe Thornton. Thornton is also the only NHL player in history to be traded in the same year they won the Art Ross Trophy as the NHL’s leading scorer.

Excluding the six split-team situations above, and excluding franchises that have simply changed cities, 16 players have achieved complete 100-point-or-more seasons with two teams.

Five defencemen have scored at least 100 points in a season. They are Bobby Orr (six times, including the overall defenceman record of 139 points in ), Paul Coffey (five times), Denis Potvin, Al MacInnis, and Brian Leetch (the most recent, in ).

The youngest player to achieve a 100-point season is Sidney Crosby, at 18 years, 253 days old. The oldest player to achieve a 100-point season is Gordie Howe, at 40 years, 364 days—the day before his 41st birthday.

When he accomplished this feat in 1981–82, Gretzky also became the first ever player to surpass 160, 170, 180, and 190 points in a season. While Gretzky would surpass each of the 160 through 190-point thresholds multiple times, only one other player has ever reached those marksMario Lemieux. It is only at the 150-point threshold that a few other players (three) have joined those two players: the five players to achieve or surpass a 150-point season are Wayne Gretzky (nine times), Mario Lemieux (four times), and once each for Phil Esposito, Bernie Nicholls and Steve Yzerman. Names and number of seasons quickly escalate below 150 points.

Team achievements
Excluding the six split-team players above, the Edmonton Oilers have had the most incidents of a player achieving 100 points during the franchise's history, with 36. Excluding the same six players, the Pittsburgh Penguins also had the greatest number of unique players achieve 100 points, with 12. The Boston Bruins have had 10 players achieve 100 points, and the Edmonton Oilers have had nine players achieve 100 points while with the team.

The Boston Bruins were the first team to have four players achieve 100 points in the same season, . The Pittsburgh Penguins are the only other team to register four players with 100 points in the same season, 1992–93.

The Pittsburgh Penguins have had at least one 100-point player in 23 different seasons.

The Los Angeles Kings are the only team to have two players achieve 150+ points in the same year, with Wayne Gretzky (168 points) and Bernie Nicholls (150 points) achieving this in 1988–89.

Three franchises have had 100 point players before and after the entire team moved: the Hartford Whalers/Carolina Hurricanes, the Atlanta Flames/Calgary Flames, and the Quebec Nordiques/Colorado Avalanche. Three franchises have had 100-point players in their original city, but not their new city: Minnesota North Stars (now Dallas Stars), original Winnipeg Jets (now Arizona Coyotes) and Atlanta Thrashers (now Winnipeg Jets).

Of the 31 franchises in the NHL in 2021–22, five have never had a player achieve a 100 point season: New Jersey Devils (started as Kansas City Scouts in 1974–75), Nashville Predators, Columbus Blue Jackets (joined in ), and the two newest teams, the Vegas Golden Knights and Seattle Kraken.

Players and their 100-point seasons

Legend
Team – Team for which the player acquired 100 points or more
GP – Games played
G – Goals
A – Assists
(D) – Defenceman

References

100 point seasons